Coenraad de Villiers (born 28 March 1933) is a South African wrestler. He competed at the 1956 Summer Olympics and the 1960 Summer Olympics.

References

External links
 

1933 births
Living people
South African male sport wrestlers
Olympic wrestlers of South Africa
Wrestlers at the 1956 Summer Olympics
Wrestlers at the 1960 Summer Olympics
People from Theewaterskloof Local Municipality
Commonwealth Games medallists in wrestling
Commonwealth Games bronze medallists for South Africa
Wrestlers at the 1958 British Empire and Commonwealth Games
Medallists at the 1958 British Empire and Commonwealth Games